is Japanese singer and songwriter under Being label.

Biography
Under the influence of her father, Shiori grew up listening to various music genres such as rock, punk and blues. In elementary school she learned to play on piano, in junior high school she formed band and played on electronic guitar. After finishing high school, she started fully took guitar and vocal lessons. She performed street lives in Shinjuku and Ohmiya.

In June 2012, Shiori applied in audition Jibun wo Kaetakute and won Grand Prix Treasure Hunt2012 with her original song Dakarasa and cover of Sheena Ringo cover Marunouchi Sadistic. Dakarasa was released as a single in limited copies on December 12.

On April 17, 2013 she made major debut with single Yureru Yureru.

On March 26, 2014 she released her first studio album Shiori. On April 20–26 she held her first solo tour Shiorigoto. On July debut album Shiori was nominated on the CD Shop Awards "2015". On December her fifth single Zettai was released in three formats, one includes short live footage from first solo tour Shiorigoto.

In April 2016 she appeared as a supporting actress on Japanese television series Love song. With collaboration of a Japanese actor and musician Masaharu Fukuyama, she released her first digital single Koi no Naka which was later used in television series as a insert theme song. On November she released her third and final studio album Finder no Mukou.

Her music and live activities has started decrease after 2017. On March she made appearance on commercial of Nippon Telegraph and Telephone and performed song Rakugakichou. On September she released her final single Sayonara Watashi no Koigokoro which was produced and composed by Japanese singer-songwriter Chara, the single includes b-side track commercial song previously recorded on March. On November recording footage of Kan cover Ai wa Katsu was released on the official YouTube channel of Nippon Foundation. The cover song was never released in any music format.

In January 2018 Shiori released her only compilation album Shiori Goto: Best which includes all released 9 singles and as part of first-press bonus all music videoclips which were recorded for single promotions. In February 2018 Shiori held her final solo tour which was part of her fifth debut anniversary celebration. Video footages from acoustic live Shiori dake: Hitori Uta and final tour Shiori Goto: Best were released in DVD format within that year.

On October 20 through official website staff has announced hiatus of her music activities since December 2018.

On 10 February 2020, she temporarily returned as a ciii and uploaded on her temporary YouTube Channel song Ano Bus ni Noranakucha and shared the name of Instagram account, which has been active from autumn 2019 until January 2021.

In April 2021, Shiori officially announced resume of her music activities through official website. At the same time was announced new promotional song for the online drama Love Delusion.

Discography
During her 6-year career Shiori released 9 singles, 2 DVD, 3 studio and 1 compilation albums.

Singles

Studio albums

Compilation albums

DVD

Interview
From Barks:
Yureru Yureru
Don't Cry
Hitorigoto
•Ima wa Koko ni Iru
Shiori
Zettai
Hello Goodbye

From Natalie Inc:
Yureru Yureru
Don't Cry
Hitorigoto
Ima Koko ni Iru
Shiori
Zettai
Hello Goodbye

From Billboard Japan
Yureru Yureru
Hitorigoto
Ima Koko ni Iru
Shiori
Zettai
Hello-Goodbye

From Modelpress:
Atashi wa Atashi no Mama de (part 1), (part 2)

From Teena
Atashi wa Atashi no Mama de

From Diskgarage
Shiorigoto: Best

References

External links
Official website 
Official YouTube channel 
Official Twitter 
Official Line blog 

1996 births
Living people
Being Inc. artists
J-pop singers
Japanese songwriters
Musicians from Saitama Prefecture
21st-century Japanese singers
21st-century Japanese women singers